Fast Colombia S.A.S., trading as Viva Air Colombia and formerly VivaColombia, is a Colombian low-cost airline based in Rionegro, Antioquia, Colombia. It is a subsidiary of Irelandia Aviation and third largest airline in the country. The company is not legally affiliated with Mexico's VivaAerobús, a fellow low-cost carrier co-founded by Irelandia which also uses the "Viva" brand, although they do have a codeshare agreement for their flights.

History

Foundation and early years
The airline is part of the Irelandia Aviation group, a low-cost airline developer led by Declan Ryan (chairman of the Viva Air group and one of the founders of Ryanair). Irelandia personnel have been involved in the development of five low-cost airlines around the world: Ryanair, Tiger Airways, Allegiant Air, VivaAerobus, and Viva Air. Irelandia owns 100% of it's shares.

On May 9, 2017, Viva Air Perú, a Peruvian subsidiary airline, was launched and with which the expansion process throughout Latin America continues.

In April 2018, the company changed its name from VivaColombia to Viva Air Colombia to expand its model in Latin America and within the expansion plan Santa Marta was announced as the third center of operations in Colombia. The operations center was enabled in October 2018, with routes that were not covered by other airlines such as Santa Marta, San Andrés, Bucaramanga, and Pereira. This operations center would be assigned two aircraft initially.

Merger ambitions
On April 29, 2022, it was announced that Avianca intended to acquire Viva Air Colombia. However, the Colombian Aerocivil had initially opposed the merger, citing concerns of competition reduction in the country. Despite this, negotiations for Avianca's merger have continued, and a new proposal is currently underway.

In February 2023, JetSmart and LATAM Colombia individually announced their intentions to acquire Viva Air as an alternative to Avianca. In the same month, the airline filed for bankruptcy protection following impacts of the COVID-19 pandemic and merger with Avianca. The company was forced to ground five aircraft from active service after the aircraft lessor claimed that Viva did not pay fees.

On February 23, 2023, Felix Antelo announced that he was stepping down from his role as President and CEO of the Viva Air Group, citing his health which had "declined recently". He urged Aerocivil to "make a decision right now" regarding the Avianca-Viva merger, as the company was now in grave danger of disappearing entirely. The company appointed Francisco Lalinde, previously their Vice President of Operations, as interim President and CEO of Viva Air.

On February 27, 2023, Viva Air and its subsidiary Viva Air Perú suspended their operations indefinitely and grounded their entire fleet due to the financial crisis, blaming the situation on the delay on the response from Aerocivil on the Avianca-Viva merger authorization, stating that "The (civil aviation authority's) unprecedented decision will result in further delays in reaching a decision, for which Viva is forced to announce the suspension of its operations with immediate effect." As of March 17, 2023, Viva Air has no immediate plans of resuming operations.

Destinations

Viva Air Colombia served the following destinations (as of February 2023):

Interline agreements
Viva Air Colombia maintained interline agreements with the following airlines:
Air Transat
VivaAerobús

Fleet

The Viva Air Colombia fleet consists of the following aircraft (as of March 2023):

Accidents and incidents
On February 4, 2015, an Airbus A320-200 (registered HK-5051) covering the Bogotá-Medellín route took off with 182 people, but 17 minutes later, a fire was registered in one of its engines for which it had to make an emergency landing at El Dorado International Airport. Once on the ground, the firefighters controlled the problem in the engine, which generated panic among the passengers. Aerocivil indicated that the passengers "do not present any serious situation."

See also
List of airlines of Colombia
List of low-cost airlines
Viva Air Perú

References

Citations

Bibliography

External links

 Viva Air Colombia

Defunct airlines of Colombia
Airlines established in 2009
Airlines disestablished in 2023
Colombian brands
Companies based in Medellín
Defunct low-cost airlines
Colombian companies established in 2009
2023 disestablishments in Colombia